Shean is both a surname and a given name. Notable people with the name include:

Surname
Al Shean (1868–1949), comedian and vaudeville performer
Dave Shean (1883–1963), American professional baseball second baseman
Kelli Shean (born 1987), golfer from South Africa

Given name
Shean Donovan (born 1975), Canadian professional ice hockey coach and former player
Shean Garlito (born 1994), Belgian footballer
Chan Chi-shean or Steve Chan (born 1948), Taiwanese physician and politician
Yan Wing-shean (born 1966), Taiwanese fencer

See also
Gallagher and Shean, musical comedy double act in vaudeville and on Broadway in the 1910s and 1920s, consisting of Edward Gallagher (1873–1929), and Al Shean (1868–1949)
Mister Gallagher and Mister Shean, one of the most famous songs to come from vaudeville
Gradam Shean-nós Cois Life, annual award by the Sean-nós Cois Life-festival in Dublin
Beit-Shean, a city in the Northern District of Israel at the junction of the Jordan River Valley and the Jezreel Valley
Sean
Sheahan
Sheean (disambiguation)
Sheeaun
Sheehan